Dashtkar (also Romanized as Dashtkār and Dasht-e Kār; also known as Dasht-e Kanār) is a city in Mashiz Rural District, in the Central District of Bardsir County, Kerman Province, Iran. At the 2006 census, its population was 2,562, in 595 families.

References 

Populated places in Bardsir County
Cities in Kerman Province